Bardsey may refer to:

Bardsey Island, Wales
Bardsey Lighthouse, on Bardsey Island
Bardsey, West Yorkshire, England
Bardsey cum Rigton, West Yorkshire, England

See also 
Bardsea, Cumbria, England